Guire Poulard (6 January 1942 – 9 December 2018) was a Haitian Roman Catholic archbishop who served as Archbishop of Port-au-Prince, from 26 March 2011 until his resignation on 7 October 2017.

Biography 
Poulard was born in Haiti and was ordained to the priesthood in 1972. He served as bishop of the Roman Catholic Diocese of Jacmel from 1988 to 2009. He then served as bishop of the Roman Catholic Diocese of Les Cayes from 2009 to 2011. Poulard served as archbishop of the Roman Catholic Archdiocese of Port-au-Prince from 2011 to 2017, succeeding Joseph Serge Miot, who died due to the 2010 Haiti earthquake. His resignation was accepted by Pope Francis on 7 October 2017 due to reaching the age limit, while appointing Max Leroy Mésidor, until then Archbishop of Cap-Haïtien, as Archbishop of Port-au-Prince. He died on 9 December 2018.

Notes

External links

1942 births
2018 deaths
21st-century Roman Catholic archbishops in Haiti
20th-century Roman Catholic bishops in Haiti
Deaths from pancreatic cancer
Haitian Roman Catholic archbishops
Roman Catholic bishops of Les Cayes
Roman Catholic bishops of Jacmel
Roman Catholic archbishops of Port-au-Prince